FC Kairat Moscow was a Russian football team based in Moscow. It was founded in 2021 as a farm-club for Kazakhstani club FC Kairat and was licensed for the third-tier Russian FNL 2 for the 2021–22 season. Kazakhstan is a member of the Eurasian Economic Union, and thus Kazakhstani players are not considered foreign players for the purposes of Russian football regulations, those regulations otherwise prohibit third-tier clubs from signing any players who would not be eligible to play for the Russian national team.

History
In January 2022, Kirill Keker was appointed as Head Coach of Kairat Moscow.

Domestic history

Final squad

Managers
Information correct as of match played 14 November 2021. Only competitive matches are counted.

Notes:

References

Association football clubs established in 2021
Association football clubs disestablished in 2022
Defunct football clubs in Moscow
2021 establishments in Russia
2022 disestablishments in Russia
Kazakhstan–Russia relations